Bharathan is an Indian filmmaker and writer who works in Tamil films. He has directed with actor Vijay twice in his career.

Career
He initially began his career as a dialogue writer to film director Dharani and penned dialogues for the Vikram-starrer Dhill (2001), Dhool (2003) and Vijay-starrer Ghilli (2004), as well as for Madhesh's Madhurey (2004). Since then, he has intermittently been credited as a dialogue writer, most notably working on Ajith Kumar's Veeram (2014) which was directed by Siva.

Bharathan made his directorial debut with the thriller film Azhagiya Tamil Magan (2007) starring Vijay and Shriya Saran in the lead roles and Had a renowned technical crew, including music composed by A. R. Rahman. His second film, the thriller Athithi (2014) featuring Nandha and Nikesh Ram, opened to mixed reviews . He later worked with Vijay again in Bairavaa (2017), with the film taking a strong opening at the box office.

Filmography

References

21st-century Indian film directors
Year of birth missing (living people)
Living people
Tamil screenwriters
Tamil film directors